Sylvie Baïpo-Temon is a Central African politician who has served as the Minister of Foreign Affairs of the Central African Republic since 14 December 2018. She replaced Charles-Armel Doubane, who is regarded as being too pro-Western, as President Faustin-Archange Touadéra has recently made an effort to increase ties to Russia. She formerly worked as a financial analyst at BNP Paribas since 2003 and has no previous diplomatic experience. In July 2022, Sylvie Baïpo-Temon was ordered by the French tax authorities to pay unpaid taxes in the amount of €18,000.

References

Living people
BNP Paribas people
Foreign ministers of the Central African Republic
Central African Republic women diplomats
Female foreign ministers
Year of birth missing (living people)
Women government ministers of the Central African Republic